Stilb can refer to:
Mullet (haircut)
Stilb (unit), a CGS unit of luminance